The All-Ireland Senior Hurling Championship 2008 was the 122nd since its establishment by the Gaelic Athletic Association in 1887. The first matches of the season were played on 25 May 2008, and the championship ended on 7 September 2008. Kilkenny went into the 2008 championship as defending champions, having won their thirtieth All-Ireland title the previous year.

The championship culminated with the All-Ireland final, held at Croke Park, Dublin. The match was contested by Kilkenny and Waterford.  It was their first meeting in the final since 1963.  Kilkenny won the game by 3–30 to 1–13.  It was their third All-Ireland title in succession and a record thirty-first for the county. Kilkenny overtook Cork with the most All Ireland Titles. A position which they have not lost since.

Format

The format of the 2008 championship was slightly different from previous formats:

12 counties participated in Tier 1 of the 2008 Championship.  These teams were as follows:
 Leinster: Dublin, Kilkenny, Laois, Offaly, Wexford
 Munster: Clare, Cork, Limerick, Tipperary, Waterford
 Connacht: Galway
 Ulster: Antrim

Provincial Championships

The Leinster and Munster championships were played as usual. The Leinster and Munster champions advanced directly to the All-Ireland semi-finals.

All-Ireland Qualifiers

Phase 1: (1 match) This was a single match between Antrim and Galway.

Phase 2: (2 matches) The winner of the phase 1 game played the team eliminated in the first round of the Leinster Championship. The loser of the phase 1 game played the team eliminated in the first round of the Munster Championship.

Phase 3: (2 matches) This phase consisted of two knock-out games between the beaten provincial semi-finalists in Leinster and Munster. Teams from the same province could not meet in these games.

Phase 4: (2 matches) The winners from phase 2 played the winners from phase 3 in a knock-out format.

All-Ireland Series

Quarter-finals: (2 matches) The defeated Munster and Leinster finalists played the winners of the qualifier phase 4 games.

Semi-finals: (2 matches) The Munster and Leinster champions played the winners of the quarter-finals.

Promotion/relegation

The losing teams from the qualifier phase 2 games played off. The loser of this game played a promotion/relegation play-off against the winners of the Christy Ring Cup.

Team facts

Leinster Senior Hurling Championship

Munster Senior Hurling Championship

Ulster Senior Hurling Championship 
2008 marked the first time in decades that all nine Ulster counties (plus London) competed in the Ulster championship.

Due to the historical strength of Antrim and the relative strength of Down, and more recently Derry and Armagh, a system of seeding was used to prevent one-sided matches. The success of the format was indicated by two 'underdog' victories, for Monaghan over Donegal, and London over Armagh, and a number of close matches. However, Antrim retained the trophy beating Down in the final.

Qualifiers 
 {{3RoundBracket-Byes
| seeds=no |RD1=Phase 2+3|RD2-score2=0-18|RD1-team7= Cork|RD1-score7=1-17|RD1-seed8=4L|RD1-team8= Dublin|RD1-score8=0-15|RD2-seed1=5M|RD2-team1= Waterford|RD2-score1=2-18|RD2-seed2=1C|RD2-team2= Offaly|RD2-seed3=3L|RD1-score6=0-09|RD2-team3= Galway|RD2-score3=2-15|RD2-seed4=3M|RD2-team4= Cork|RD2-score4=0-23|RD3-seed1=5M|RD3-team1= Waterford|RD3-score1=|RD3-seed2=3M|RD3-team2= Cork|RD1-seed7=3M|RD1-team6= Laois|RD2=Phase 4|RD1-seed2=1U|RD3=|group1=|group2=|group3=|seed-width=|team-width=|score-width=|RD1-seed1=5M|RD1-team1= Waterford|RD1-score1=6-18|RD1-team2= Antrim|RD1-seed6=5L|RD1-score2=0-15|RD1-seed3=4M|RD1-team3= Limerick|RD1-score3=0-18|RD1-seed4=3L|RD1-team4= Offaly|RD1-score4=3-19|RD1-seed5=1C|RD1-team5= Galway|RD1-score5=1-26|RD3-score2=}}

 Relegation play-offs 

 All-Ireland Senior Hurling Championship 

Championship statistics
Scoring
Top scorer from play in the championship: John Mullane for Waterford 2-21 
First goal of the championship: Brian Carroll for Offaly against Laois (Leinster quarter-final)
Last goal of the championship: Eoin Kelly for Waterford against Kilkenny (All-Ireland final)
First hat-trick of the championship: Joe Bergin for Offaly against Limerick (All-Ireland qualifier)
Widest winning margin: 26 pointsWaterford 6-21 : 1-10 Antrim (All-Ireland qualifier)
Most goals in a match: 7Antrim 1-10 : 6-21 Waterford (All-Ireland qualifier)
Laois 4-18 : 3-11 Carlow (Relegation final)
Most points in a match: 49Clare 2-26 :0-23 Waterford (Munster quarter-final)
Most goals by one team in a match: 6Waterford 6-21 : 1-10 Antrim (All-Ireland qualifier)
Galway 6-21 : 0-15 Antrim (All-Ireland qualifier)
Most goals scored by a losing team: 3Wexford 3-15 : 2-19 Waterford (All-Ireland quarter-final)
Carlow 3-11 : 4-18 Laois (Relegation final)
Most points scored by a losing team: 23'Waterford 0-23 : 2-26 Clare (Munster quarter-final)

Cards
Most yellow cards: Waterford (16)
Fewest yellow cards: Galway (1)
Most red cards: Antrim, Clare, Cork, Laois and Wexford (1)
Fewest red cards: Waterford, Kilkenny, Tipperary, Limerick, Dublin, Offaly and Galway (0)

Overall
Most goals scored - Waterford (12)
Most points scored - Waterford (111)
Most goals conceded - Antrim (12)
Most points conceded - Waterford (122)
Fewest goals scored - Antrim and Limerick (1)
Fewest points scored - Carlow (11)
Fewest goals conceded - Kilkenny (1)
Fewest points conceded - Carlow and Westmeath (18)

Miscellaneous

 Kilkenny win their 31st All-Ireland title to become outright leaders on the all-time roll of honour for the first time in their history.
 Top scorer from play John Mullane didn't win an all star.
 Waterford become the second top-scoring team in a hurling championship season to have a negative score difference (Westmeath 1961)

Player facts
DebutantesThe following players made their début in the 2008 championship:RetireesThe following players played their last game in the 2008 championship:Top scorers
Season

Single game

Clean sheets

Monthly awards

Annual awards
Vodafone Hurler of the Year
The Vodafone Hurler of the Year award for 2008 was won by Eoin Larkin of Kilkenny.

The shortlist for the Vodafone Hurler of the Year award, in alphabetical order, was as follows:
Eddie Brennan (Kilkenny)
Eoin Kelly (Waterford)
Eoin Larkin (Kilkenny)

Vodafone Young Hurler of the Year
The Vodafone Young Hurler of the Year award for 2008 was won by Joe Canning of Galway.

The shortlist for the Vodafone Young Hurler of the Year award, in alphabetical order, was as follows:
Séamus Callinan (Tipperary)
Joe Canning (Galway)
Cathal Naughton (Cork)

Opel GPA Hurler of the Year
The Opel GPA Hurler of the Year award for 2008 was won by Eoin Larkin of Kilkenny.

The shortlist for the Opel GPA Hurler of the Year award, in alphabetical order, was as follows:
Eddie Brennan (Kilkenny)
Eoin Larkin (Kilkenny)
Shane McGrath (Tipperary)

Managerial changes
The following managerial changes took place during and immediately after the championship.

StadiaThe following stadia were used during the championship:''

See also
 2008 All-Ireland Senior Football Championship

References

External links
All-Ireland Hurling Championship Results
Official GAA Website
RTÉ Sport Website
Hurling Statistics

All-Ireland Senior Hurling Championships
All-Ireland Senior Hurling Championship